Dyneley is a surname and a given name. Notable people with the name include: 

Dyneley Hussey (1893-1972), English war poet, journalist, art critic and music critic
John Dyneley Prince (1868-1945), American linguist, diplomat, and politician
Peter Dyneley (1921-1977), Anglo-Canadian actor